Candice Tells All is a Canadian interior design show that aired on the W Network featuring designer Candice Olson.

References

External links 
 Official Website

2011 Canadian television series debuts
2010s Canadian reality television series
2013 Canadian television series endings
W Network original programming